André Winkhold (born 4 March 1962) is a German football manager and former player who played as a midfielder.

References

Living people
1962 births
Sportspeople from Aachen
German footballers
Association football midfielders
Bundesliga players
Borussia Mönchengladbach players
Hertha BSC players
Fortuna Düsseldorf players
Alemannia Aachen players
German football managers
Alemannia Aachen managers
Footballers from North Rhine-Westphalia